Indonesia competed at the 2004 Summer Paralympics in Athens, Greece. The team included 3 athletes,  but won no medals.

Sports

Swimming

Wheelchair tennis

See also
Indonesia at the Paralympics
Indonesia at the 2004 Summer Olympics

References 

Nations at the 2004 Summer Paralympics
2004
Summer Paralympics